A mortal sin, in Catholic theology, is a gravely sinful act, which can lead to damnation.

Mortal Sin(s) may also refer to:

Film and television
 The Mortal Sin, an American lost 1917 silent film
 Mortal Sin (film), a 1970 Brazilian film
 Mortal Sin, a 1977 film featuring Paul Naschy
 Mortal Sins, a 1989 film featuring Debrah Farentino and James Saito
 Mortal Sins, a 1992 film featuring Lisa Vultaggio and Christopher Reeve
 "Mortal Sins" (Highlander), a 1995 television episode

Other uses
 Mortal Sin (band), an Australian metal band
 Mortal Sins, a 2009 novel in the World of the Lupi series by Eileen Wilks
 Mortal Sins, a 2013 book by Michael D'Antonio